Tendency or tendencies may refer to:

 Seasonal tendencies, qualities of economic phenomena that appear to be related to the calendar
 "Tendencies", a song by Hollywood Undead on the 2011 album American Tragedy
 Tendency film, socially conscious, left-leaning films produced in Japan during the 1920s and 1930s

See also

 Tend (disambiguation)
 Tendenz